Road Movies Filmproduktion is a German film production company formed by Wim Wenders in 1977, and they have acted as producer of some of Wenders' films, and they have produced a number of films directed by Ken Loach.

Filmography

1977 - The American Friend
1978 - The Left-Handed Woman
1979 - ...als Diesel geboren
1980 - Lightning Over Water
1980 - Radio On  
1980 - Die Kinder aus Nr. 67
1982 - The State of Things
1984 - Chinese Boxes  
1984 - Paris, Texas 
1984 - Flight to Berlin
1986 -   
1986 - Der Rosenkönig
1987 - Anita: Dances of Vice  
1987 - Wings of Desire  
1987 - Yer demir gök bakir 
1988 - The Passenger – Welcome to Germany
1989 - Notebook on Cities and Clothes  
1991 - Until the End of the World  
1993 - L'Absence
1993 - Madregilda  
1993 - Faraway, So Close!  
1994 - Lisbon Story  
1994 - Alta marea
1997 - The End of Violence  
1997 - Für immer und immer  
1998 - Ristiinnaulittu vapaus  
1998 - Don Juan  
1999 - Buena Vista Social Club  
2000 - Princesa  
2000 - My Generation  
2000 - Liam  
2000 - Gangster No. 1   
2000 - Lista de Espera  
2000 - Bread and Roses 
2000 - Nora  
2000 - The Million Dollar Hotel 
2001 - Buñuel y la mesa del rey Salomón  
2001 - The Navigators  
2001 - Me Without You  
2001 - Dead by Monday
2002 - Junimond  
2002 - 24 heures de la vie d'une femme  
2002 - Ten Minutes Older: The Cello   
2002 - Sweet Sixteen 
2002 - Deux  
2002 - Ten Minutes Older: The Trumpet  
2002 - Bend It Like Beckham 
2003 - The Blues 
2003 - The Soul of a Man 
2005 - Don't Come Knocking

Film production companies of Germany